"Christmas Time's A-Comin'" is a popular bluegrass Christmas standard song written by Bell Labs engineer Benjamin "Tex" Logan.

Originally recorded by Bill Monroe in 1951, the song was covered in 1994 by American country music singer Sammy Kershaw on his album of the same name, charting in 1995 and 1998 on the Billboard country charts, respectively reaching #50 and #53 those years.

Covers
The song has also been recorded by (among others):
 Johnny Cash, The Johnny Cash Family Christmas, 1972
 Emmylou Harris, Light of the Stable, 1979
 Raffi (musician) Raffi's Christmas Album, 1983
 Patty Loveless, Bluegrass & White Snow: A Mountain Christmas, 2002
 Rhonda Vincent, Beautiful Star: A Christmas Collection, 2006
 Peter Rowan, Sugar Plums: Holiday Treats From Sugar Hill, 1993 (compilation album only?)
 Sammy Kershaw, Christmas Time's A-Comin', 1994
 Diamond Rio, A Diamond Rio Christmas: The Star Still Shines, 2007
 Charlie Daniels with The Grascals, Joy to the World: A Bluegrass Christmas, 2009
 The Oak Ridge Boys, Christmas Time's A-Coming, 2012
 The Waltons cast, A Walton's Christmas: Together Again, 1999

References

1951 songs
American Christmas songs
Bluegrass songs
Bill Monroe songs